Sven Wetzel (born 13 January 1987) is a German international rugby union player, playing for the TSV Handschuhsheim in the Rugby-Bundesliga and the German national rugby union team.

He made his debut for Germany in an ENC match against Poland on 20 November 2010.

Stats
Sven Wetzel's personal statistics in club and international rugby:

Club

 As of 25 August 2011

National team

European Nations Cup

Friendlies & other competitions

 As of 8 April 2012

References

External links
  Sven Wetzel at the DRV website
  Sven Wetzel at totalrugby.de
 

1987 births
Living people
German rugby union players
Germany international rugby union players
TSV Handschuhsheim players
Rugby union hookers